Jam Sahib, is the title of the ruling prince of Nawanagar, now known as Jamnagar in Gujarat, an Indian princely state.

Jam Sahibs of Nawanagar

References

External links
 Nawanagar History and Genealogy at Queensland University

Royal titles
Jamnagar district
Maharajas of Nawanagar
Titles in India
1540 establishments in India